Roosevelt Harrell III (born February 20, 1972) professionally known as Bink is an American hip hop producer from Norfolk, Virginia, who is noted for his work with Roc-A-Fella Records artists. His most high-profile work has been Jay-Z's critically acclaimed album The Blueprint, for which he produced three tracks, including the first and last tracks on the album. He is sometimes credited as Bink! or Bink Dog. In 2011, Bink and American-reggae artist Atiba finished a collaborative album titled Foreigner. A release date for the project has yet to be announced.

1990s

1996

 Blackstreet – Another Level
"Don't Leave Me" (co-produced by Teddy Riley)

1997

 702 – All I Want (CDS)
"All I Want" (Bink Dogg Mix)

 Lost Boyz – Love, Peace & Nappiness
"Intro" (co-produced by Charles Suitt)
"Beasts from the East" (featuring A+, Redman & Canibus)
"Tight Situations"
"Day 1"
"From My Family to Yours (Dedication)"

1998

 Krumb Snatcha – Snatcha Season Pt. 1
"Gangsta Disease" (Remix)

 Various – Caught Up soundtrack
Lost Boyz – "Ordinary Guy"

1999

 Tevin Campbell – Losing All Control (CDS)
"Losing All Control" (Bink Dog Remix) (co-produced by Stevie J)

 Terry Dexter – Terry Dexter
"I Try"

 A+ – Hempstead High
"Up Top New York" (featuring Mr. Cheeks of the Lost Boyz)
"Boyz to Men" (featuring Lost Boyz & Canibus)
"Understand The Game" (featuring Erykah Badu)
What The Deal" (featuring Cardan)
"Parkside Gardens"

 ShanDozia – ShanDozia 
"Love You So Much"
"Crazy"

 Coko – Hot Coko 
"Triflin'" (featuring Eve) (co-produced by Brian Alexander Morgan)

 Kurupt – Tha Streetz Iz a Mutha
"Trylogy"
"Girls All Pause" (featuring Nate Dogg & Roscoe)

 U-God – Golden Arms Redemption
"Bizarre"

 Lil' Cease  – The Wonderful World of Cease A Leo
"Long Time Comin'" (featuring Mr. Bristal & Larce "Banger" Vegas of Junior M.A.F.I.A.)
"Play Around" (featuring Lil' Kim, Mr. Bristal & Joe Hooker)

2000s

2000

 Tamia – A Nu Day
"Can't Go for That" (co-produced by Missy Elliott)
"Wanna Be" (featuring Missy Elliott) (co-produced by Missy Elliott)
"Can't Go for That (Remix)" (featuring 213) (co-produced by Missy Elliott)

 Tamia – Can't Go for That (CDS)
"Can't Go for That" (Missy's Mix) (co-produced by Missy Elliott)
 
 Torrey Carter – The Life I Live
"Floss Ya Jewels" (featuring Missy Elliott) (co-produced by Missy Elliott)

 Lil' Mo – Based on a True Story
"Club 2G" (featuring Naam & Missy Elliott) (co-produced by Missy Elliott)
"Club 2G" (Demo Version) (featuring Missy Elliott) (co-produced by Missy Elliott)

 Various – Any Given Sunday soundtrack
Missy Elliott – "Who You Gonna Call" (co-produced by Missy Elliott & Tony McAnany)

 Various – Bait soundtrack
Total – "Quick Rush" (featuring Missy Elliott) (co-produced by Missy Elliott)

 Beanie Sigel  – The Truth
"Raw & Uncut" (featuring Jay-Z)
"Ride 4 My"

 Jay-Z  – The Dynasty: Roc La Familia
"1-900-Hustler" (featuring Beanie Sigel, Memphis Bleek & Freeway)
"You, Me, Him and Her" (featuring Beanie Sigel, Memphis Bleek & Amil)

 Prodigy  – H.N.I.C.
"Rock Dat Shit"

 Mystikal  – Let's Get Ready
"Mystikal Fever"

2001

 AZ  – 9 Lives
"That's Real" (featuring Beanie Sigel)

 Angie Martinez – Up Close and Personal
"Coast 2 Coast (Suavemente)" (Remix) (featuring Wyclef Jean) (co-produced by Domingo)

 Aaliyah – Unreleased track
"Where Could He Be?" (featuring Missy Elliott & Tweet) (co-produced by Missy Elliott)

 P. Diddy and the Bad Boy Family – The Saga Continues...
"The Last Song" (featuring Loon, Mark Curry & Big Azz Ko)

 Jay-Z  – The Blueprint
"The Ruler's Back"
"All I Need"
"Blueprint (Momma Loves Me)"

 Various – Hardball
R.O.C. – "Who Ya Love"

 Various – Violator: The Album, V2.0
Capone & Noyd – "Options"

 Coo Coo Cal – Disturbed
"Freak Nasty"

 Mocha – Bella Mafia
"The Streetz" (featuring Lil' Mo)

 Fat Joe  – Jealous Ones Still Envy (J.O.S.E.)
"Get The Hell On With That" (featuring Ludacris & Armageddon)

 Mr. Cheeks  – John P. Kelly
"Lights, Camera, Action!"

 Faith Evans – Faithfully
"Intro"

 Nate Dogg  – Music & Me
"I Got Love"
"Backdoor"
"Real Pimp" (featuring Ludacris)
"I Got Love" (Remix) (featuring B.R.E.T.T., Fabolous & Kurupt)

2002

 Eve  – Eve-Olution
"Ryde Away"

 Blackalicious – It's Going Down (Sit Back) (CDS)
"It's Going Down Pt. 2" (BINK! Remix)

 Xzibit  – Man vs. Machine
"The Gambler" (featuring Anthony Hamilton)
"My Life, My World"

 Boot Camp Clik – The Chosen Few
"That's Tough (Little Bit)"

 GZA  – Legend of the Liquid Sword
"Silent"
"Animal Planet" (co-produced by Tyquan Walker)

 Kool G Rap – The Giancana Story
"Where You At" (featuring Prodigy)

 Various – Barbershop soundtrack
P. Diddy – "And We" (featuring Black Rob, Big Azz Ko & G. Dep)

 Various – xXx soundtrack
Mr. Cheeks – "Lights, Camera, Action!" (Club Mix) (featuring P. Diddy & Missy Elliott)

2003

 Dani Stevenson – Is There Another?!
"It's Like a Jungle"

 Lene Nystrøm – Play with Me
"Pants Up"

 State Property – The Chain Gang Vol. 2
"Rolling Down the Freeway" (featuring Freeway)

 Freeway – Philadelphia Freeway
"All My Life" (featuring Nate Dogg)
"Victim of the Ghetto (featuring Rell)

 Loon – Loon
"Hey Woo" (featuring Missy Elliott)

 Nate Dogg – Nate Dogg
"Right Back Where You Are"

 Mr. Cheeks – Back Again!
"Hands High"
"I Apologize" (featuring Glenn Lewis)
"Let's Get Wild" (featuring Floetry)
"Back Again"

 Dave Hollister – Real Talk
"Never Gonna Change" (co-produced by Tyquan Walker)

 Bow Wow – Unleashed
"Follow Me"

2004

 Jin – The Rest Is History
"The Come Thru"

 Young Gunz – Tough Luv
"Future of the Roc"

 Copywrite – Cruise Control Mixtape: Volume 1
"Size 12's"

 JoJo – JoJo
"Homeboy"

2005

 Beanie Sigel – The B. Coming
"One Shot Deal" (featuring Redman)

 Brooke Valentine – Chain Letter
"Ghetto Supastarz"
"Tell Me Why? (You Don't Love Me)"

 Amerie – Touch
"Can We Go" (featuring Carl Thomas)

 Memphis Bleek – 534
"The One" (featuring Rihanna)
"Oh Baby" (featuring Young Gunz)

2006

 Jaheim – Ghetto Classics
"Everytime I Think about Her" (featuring Jadakiss)

 LL Cool J – Todd Smith
"We're Gonna Make It" (featuring Mary Mary)

 Stat Quo – Underground Atlanta Vol. 4 - The Prequel to Statlanta
"The Beast" (featuring Truth Hurts)

 MoeRoc – Wu-Tang: Out of Control
"Home of the Hustler"

 Gift of Gab – Supreme Lyricism Vol. 1
"It's Goin Down" (Remix) (featuring Lateef the Truthspeaker, Talib Kweli & Chief Xcel of Blackalicious)

 Various – Waist Deep soundtrack
Sam Scarfo – "Who Want It"

2007

 Royce da 5'9" – The Bar Exam
"The Dream" (featuring Rell)

 Amerie – Because I Love It
"Paint Me Over"

 Free – Pressure Free
"Uh Huh" (featuring Busta Rhymes) (co-produced by Precision)

 Chuck Brown – We're About the Business
"Love Nationwide"

 Cassidy – B.A.R.S. The Barry Adrian Reese Story
"Damn I Miss The Game"

 Freeway – Free at Last
"Still Got Love"
"When They Remember"

2008

 Skillz – The Million Dollar Backpack
"(For Real) He Don't Own Me"
"I'm Gon Make It"

 Bishop Lamont – The Confessional
"Africa" (featuring Soul Nana)

 J Dilla – Pay Jay
"Diary"

 Rick Ross – Trilla
"We Shinin'"

2009

 Joe Budden – Escape Route
"For You" (featuring Royce da 5'9")

 Rick Ross – Deeper Than Rap
"Cigar Music"

 Method Man & Redman – Blackout! 2
"Four Minutes to Lock Down'" (featuring Raekwon & Ghostface Killah)

2010s

2010

 Kanye West – My Beautiful Dark Twisted Fantasy
"Devil in a New Dress"

 Cypress Hill – SmokeOut Compilation
"Smoke Sumthin" (featuring Ras Kass, Kurupt & Young De)

 Cassidy – C.A.S.H.
"Face 2 Face"
"Monsta Music"

 Bishop Lamont – The Shawshank Redemption/Angola 3
"Wanted Man" (featuring Chin of The New Royales)

 J. Cole – Friday Night Lights
"Villematic"

 Game – The Red Room
"Heartbreak Hotel" (featuring Diddy)

 Jamie Foxx – Best Night of My Life
"Living Better Now" (featuring Rick Ross)

2011

 Game – Purp & Patron
"Soo Woo" (featuring Lil Wayne)

 Eric Roberson – Mister Nice Guy
"Try Love"

 Gilbere Forte - "Eyes Of Veritas"
"Train Lights"

 Slim the Mobster – War Music
"Fuck You" (featuring Yummy Bingham)

 Jadakiss – I Love You (A Dedication to My Fans)
"Rock Wit Me" (featuring Teyana Taylor)

 Atiba – Foreigner
"What You Do"

Phil Adé – A Different World
"Scoreboard (feat. Black Cobain)"
"King"

2012

 Tony Williams – The King or the Fool
"Another You" (featuring Kanye West)

 Curren$y – The Stoned Immaculate
"What It Look Like (featuring Wale)"

 Paypa – Henny on the Rocks 2: The Bottle
"Tried to Tell 'Em" (featuring Raekwon, Nick D's & JD Era)
"Where's the Love" (featuring Naledge)

 Hit-Boy – HITstory 
"Jay-Z Interview"

 Busta Rhymes – Year of the Dragon
"Grind Real Slow"

 Keyshia Cole – Woman to Woman
"Next Move" (featuring Robin Thicke)

 Freeway – Diamond In the Ruff
"Dream Big" (featuring Musiq Soulchild)
"All the Hoods" (featuring Miss Daja Thomas & Alonda Rich)
"Lil' Mama"

 Fat Joe – TBA
"Pride N Joy"

2013

 Pusha T – Wrath of Caine
"I Am Forgiven"

 John Legend – Love in the Future
"Who Do We Think We Are"

 Drake – Unreleased track
"Jodeci Freestyle" (featuring J. Cole)  (Re-released in Drake's 2019 Compilation Care Package)

 Mack Wilds – New York: A Love Story
"My Crib"
"My Crib" (Remix) (featuring Pusha T)

 Paypa – Henny On The Rocks 3
"Alright" (featuring Curtains)
"Serenity" (featuring Nick D's & Emilio Rojas)

2014

 Stat Quo – ATLA
"That's Life Part 1"

 Rick Ross – Mastermind
"Mafia Music III" (featuring Sizzla & Mavado)

 Nipsey Hussle – Unreleased Track
"Respect Ya Passion"

2015

 Teedra Moses - Cognac & Conversation 
"That One" (featuring Anthony Hamilton)
"Yesterday Ain't Tomorrow"

 Dr. Dre - Compton
 "It's All On Me" (featuring Justus & BJ the Chicago Kid)

2017

 Rick Ross - Rather You Than Me

 "Santorini Greece"
 "Game Ain't Based on Sympathy"
 "Scientology"

2019

 Dreamville - Revenge of the Dreamers III
 "Swivel" feat. EarthGang

2020s

2021

 Drake - Certified Lover Boy
 "You Only Live Twice" (featuring Lil Wayne & Rick Ross) (co-produced by B-Nasty)

 AZ - Doe Or Die II
 "Just 4 U"
 “Bulletproof” 
 “Jewels For Life” (featuring Inky Johnson)

 Anthony Hamilton - Love Is The New Black
 "I’m Ready"(featuring Lil Jon)
 “I’m Sorry” 
 “Mercy” (featuring Tamika Mallory)

2022

 Dr. Dre - Grand Theft Auto Online: The Contract
 "Black Privilege" (co-produced by Dr. Dre)

References

External links 
 Bink! on Twitter
 Bink! on Discogs

Record producers from Virginia
Hip hop record producers
Musicians from Norfolk, Virginia
1972 births
Living people